Shamsul Azhar Shah is a Professor of Epidemiology and Statistics at UKM Medical Molecular Biology Institute (UMBI), and the 2nd director of UMBI.

References

External links
 Professor Shamsul Azhar Shah

Living people
1967 births
Academic staff of the National University of Malaysia
National University of Malaysia alumni
Malaysian epidemiologists